Anita M. Vandenbeld  (born December 3, 1971) is a Canadian politician, who was elected to represent the riding of Ottawa West—Nepean for the Liberal Party of Canada in the House of Commons of Canada in the 2015 Canadian federal election. She was re-elected in the same riding in 2019, and re-elected in 2021.

Vandenbeld currently serves as Parliamentary secretary to the Minister of International Development.

Education and early life
Vandenbeld was born and raised in Calgary, Alberta, in the neighbourhood of Bowness. She attended Assumption School and graduated from St. Francis High School in 1989. As a teen she worked as a page at the Bowness branch of the Calgary Public Library.

Vandenbeld's parents were immigrants from the Netherlands who built their own log home, in which she spent her early childhood. Her father was born in Deventer, the Netherlands in 1940 at the beginning of World War Two. In 1945, Herman Vandenbeld got his first candy from Canadian soldiers during the Liberation of the Netherlands. His family were union leaders who were part of the Dutch underground resistance during World War Two. His grandfather and uncle were political prisoners at the Herzogenbusch concentration camp "Kamp Vught". He was the eldest of a working-class family who arrived at Pier 21 in Halifax in 1960 with all their worldly possessions, including the bed that he slept in for 52 years of marriage to Anita's mother, Maria. He worked as a labourer for several years in Calgary before starting his piano tuning business which he ran with his wife Maria for 40 years. Vandenbeld's mother Maria was a kindergarten teacher who immigrated from the Netherlands at the age of 19. She met Anita's father while boarding with his family in Calgary.

Anita Vandenbeld was the first in her family to graduate from University. She attended the University of Calgary,  earning a B.A. (Hon.), History and Political Science, and would later study at York University, receiving an M.A. in Political and Constitutional History in 1994. Vandenbeld was the President of the University of Calgary Young Liberals during her student years.

Career

International development career
Anita Vandenbeld worked for over a decade in international democratic development, having worked in over 20 countries on inclusive governance and women’s leadership, with a specific focus on women's political participation, parliamentary development and Women, Peace and Security.

United Nations 
Vandenbeld worked on several short and long-term projects with the United Nations Development Programme and UNIFEM. She worked with the United Nations Development Programme Democratic Governance Group in New York, where she managed a multi-partner international network to promote women's political participation International Knowledge Network of Women in Politics. Before that, she was based at the UNDP Oslo Governance Centre in Norway. Vandenbeld was also as a technical specialist on parliamentary committees and outreach with UNDP in Dhaka, Bangladesh, lead author on a study on the decline of women's representation in politics in Viet Nam, and she conducted numerous trainings on women's political leadership around the world.

IKNOWPolitics 
Vandenbeld was the global manager of the International Knowledge Network of Women in Politics (iKNOWPolitics.org), an online peer support network of women in politics which operates in 4 languages across 5 continents.  iKNOWPolitics was established in 2007 as a project of 5 international organizations who decided to combine efforts to encourage women's political participation: United Nations Development Programme (UNDP), UNIFEM (now UN Women), Inter-Parliamentary Union (IPU), International IDEA, and the National Democratic Institute (NDI). During her tenure as Global project manager, Vandenbeld expanded the project by hiring regional project managers in Asia (Jakarta), the Arab States (Amman and Cairo), Sub-Saharan Africa (Bamako), Europe (Brussels), North America (New York and Washington) and South America (Lima). Vandenbeld oversaw the project's Asia-Pacific launch in Jakarta, Indonesia in 2010, and partnered on a project with the Club de Madrid on 'Women's Leadership for Peace and Security in the Horn of Africa'.

In 2009 Vandenbeld oversaw the expansion of the project into Arabic, including traveling extensively across the region to consult with women about the arabic network and host a regional launch in Jordan in 2009 with Princess Basma Bint Talal as the keynote speaker and female MP's, Ministers, opposition members and civil society leaders from across the Arab States. Vandenbeld led the resource mobilization effort of the project which expanded the project budget from $500,000 a year to $3 million a year.

National Democratic Institute 
Anita Vandenbeld has worked with the National Democratic Institute in a number of different roles, including as resident director in the Democratic Republic of Congo, conducting a women's political leadership academy in Haiti. contributing case studies on political party policy development, and as one of the five initial partners in the iKNOWPolitics project.

Democratic Republic of Congo Resident Director 
Vandenbeld was resident director in the National Democratic Institute office in the Democratic Republic of the Congo where she established a political party program during the November 2011 Congolese elections. Vandenbeld conducted a women's campaign college for over 100 women and hosted a launch of the iKNOWPolitics network with over 250 women leaders, candidates, activists and representatives of women's organizations. Vandenbeld led a program of inter-party dialogue to support peaceful competition in elections. She established a steering committee of 15 majority, opposition and unaligned political parties that met weekly in the months leading to the 2011 national elections. Under her leadership, the Institute organized multiparty workshops on communications, campaign management and women’s political involvement to help parties’ participation in the elections.

As part of the political parties program, Vandenbeld invited former US ambassador to the UN and former Governor of New Mexico, Bill Richardson to meet with Congolese political leaders to prevent election-related violence, assure transparency in the election process and continue democratic dialogue after the election The delegation met with President Kabila, and convened a meeting of 11 presidential candidates. One of the key outcomes of these meetings included a declaration on sexual violence that was developed by civil society and signed by most of the presidential candidates.

Organization for Security and Cooperation in Europe 
Anita Vandenbeld worked in both Bosnia and Herzegovina (BiH) and in Kosovo with the Organization for Security and Cooperation in Europe. In the OSCE Mission in BiH she coordinated an anti-corruption campaign during the 2000 national elections. This extensive public awareness campaign included television and radio commercials, a music video, billboards, factsheets and newspaper advertisements. The project also included a training course on investigative journalism. In Kosovo, Vandenbeld was a senior advisor to the Assembly of Kosovo in 2007 and 2008 before Kosovo declared independence on February 17, 2008.

OSCE Mission in Kosovo 
Anita Vandenbeld was Senior Advisor and Deputy Chief of the Central Assembly and Political Parties Section of the Organization for Security Cooperation in Europe Mission in Kosovo The project included support to the Assembly of Kosovo in developing a professional secretariat, supporting committees in review of draft legislation, technical advice and support to the women's caucus, and a new member orientation (induction) program following the 2007 elections. Vandenbeld was also an advisor to the Independent Oversight Board of Kosovo which acted as an independent public service tribunal to end nepotism and promote a professional public service.

The Parliamentary Centre 
Anita Vandenbeld worked on parliamentary strengthening in the Balkans with the Ottawa-based Parliamentary Centre, a Canadian non-profit, non-partisan organization that provides support to parliaments around the world. As part of the South East Europe Parliamentary Program (SEPP) Vandenbeld was responsible for the Parliamentary Centre's programming in Bosnia and Herzegovina (BiH), and assisted with the related program in Serbia to establish an office of an Auditor General in Belgrade.  In BiH Vandenbeld helped to establish a Research Library in the national parliament in Sarajevo.

Volunteer positions and boards
Anita Vandenbeld is a member of the steering committee of the World Movement for Democracy, a global network of civil society activists, scholars, parliamentarians, thought leaders, journalists and funders who are committed to advancing democracy.

Vandenbeld is a founding member of the Parliamentarian Rapid Response Team (PARRT) of Parliamentarians for Global Action. PARRT is a unique cohort of democracy champions to respond nimbly, intervening when parliamentarians and human rights defenders are at risk.

Vandenbeld was also a board member at the Parliamentary Centre, a non-partisan non-governmental Canadian organizations dedicated to supporting inclusive and accountable democratic institutions.

Vandenbeld was a founding board member of the Centre for Democratic and Participatory Governance in Brussels.

Vandenbeld also volunteered as chapter development chair for Equal Voice, a Canadian multi-partisan organization to promote women in politics.

Early career
During the Chretien and Martin governments, Vandenbeld was Director of Parliamentary Affairs in the Office of the Leader of the Government in the House of Commons and oversaw the development and implementation of the Government of Canada's Democratic Reform Action Plan under the Minister responsible for Democratic Reform. She was also a Policy Analyst with the National Liberal Caucus Research Bureau in the Canadian Parliament, and Chief of staff to a Canadian Senator.

Prior to moving to Ottawa, Vandenbeld worked at the Calgary Public Library, the University of Calgary Management Resource Centre, and as a senior analyst for Synergy Partners, a mid-market Mergers and Acquisitions firm in the oil and gas services sector in Calgary.

Awards and Medals 
In 2008, Anita Vandenbeld was awarded the Canadian Peacekeeping Service Medal for her work in Kosovo

Anita Vandenbeld was a recipient of the 2021 Esprit de Corps 'Breaking Down the Barricades - Top Women in Defence' award.

Anita Vandenbeld is a recipient of the 'Leading Women-Leading Girls' community service award.

Publications 
Anita Vandenbeld is a contributing author to the Oxford Handbook of Transnational Feminist Movements having written the chapter on 'International Trends in Women's Political Participation'.

Anita Vandenbeld contributed a chapter on women's political participation to the book 'Turning Parliament Inside Out: Practical Ideas for reforming Canada's democracy'.

As part of the Cambridge Viet-Nam Women's Leadership Programme, Anita Vandenbeld co-authored the UNDP publication 'Women's Representation in the National Assembly of Viet Nam: The Way Forward'.

Anita Vandenbeld contributed to several other United Nations Development Program (UNDP) and UNIFEM publications, including:

- 'Enhancing Youth Political Participation throughout the Electoral Cycle: A Good Practice Guide'

- 'A Users Guide to Measuring Gender Sensitive Basic Service Delivery'.

- 'Enhancing Women's Political Participation: A Policy Note for Europe and the Commonwealth of Independent States'

As chair of the Canada-Kosovo Parliamentary Friendship Group, Anita Vandenbeld hosted a reception on Parliament Hill bringing together Kosovo refugees who arrived in Canada in 1999, and the Canadians who helped them to settle here. Their stories were published by the Embassy of Kosovo in a book called 'Sure Shores'

During her work with the OSCE Mission in Kosovo Vandenbeld contributed to the publication 'Independent Agencies and Institutions in Kosovo Democracy' and authored an article for LawNow Magazine entitled 'Imposing Legitimacy: The Dilemma of International Democratic Development'

Anita Vandenbeld contributed to the National Democratic Institute publication 'Political Parties and Democracy in Theoretical and Practical Perspectives: Developing Party Policies'

Member of Parliament (2015-present)
On November 28, 2010, Vandenbeld won a contested nomination to be the Liberal Party of Canada candidate for Ottawa West-Nepean for the 2011 Canadian federal election. Vandenbeld was defeated by MP and Minister of Foreign Affairs John Baird.

Since being elected, Vandenbeld holds weekly 'mini-Town Hall' coffee hours on Friday evenings open to all constituents. These were initially held at a local Tim Hortons and are now held virtually because of the pandemic.

First term as MP
Vandenbeld again sought the Ottawa West-Nepean federal Liberal nomination for the 2015 Canadian federal election, winning a contested nomination against two other candidates on November 2, 2014. Her election campaign was successful, winning the seat with 56% of the vote on October 19, 2015. Her 35,199 votes represented the 5th highest vote total of any Liberal candidate in Ontario and the highest vote count for a female candidate in Ontario. In her first term, Vandenbeld sat on the  Standing Committee on Procedure and House Affairs, the Standing Committee on the Status of Women, the Standing Committee on Foreign Affairs and International Development and on the Standing Committee on Access to Information, Privacy and Ethics. While on the Foreign Affairs committee Vandenbeld put forward amendments to strengthen the Arms Trade Treaty, and initiated a study of Canada's International Democracy Promotion.  Vandenbeld was also the founding chair of the all-party Democracy Caucus.

Chair of Women's Caucus 
From 2015 to 2018 Vandenbeld was the Chair of the National Liberal Women's Caucus and she helped to re-establish the all-party women's caucus. One of her first activities as chair of the parliamentary women's caucus was to host the first-ever indigenous blanket ceremony for reconciliation on Parliament Hill. Vandenbeld also mentored future women candidates through weekly phone calls.

Chair of Special Committee on Pay Equity 
In March 2016, Vandenbeld was elected as Chair of the Special Committee on Pay Equity, which was formed by a motion in the House of Commons to close the gap in pay between men and women which contributes to income inequality and discriminates against women, accept pay equity as a human right, and accept the recommendations of the 2004 Pay Equity Task Force Report. The final report, which had a consensus of all parties, called "It's Time to Act" was tabled on June 9, 2016. As a result, the government appointed the first Pay Equity Commissioner and passed Pay Equity legislation which comes into force August 31, 2021.

Chair of the Sub-committee on International Human Rights 
Vandenbeld was chair of the House of Commons Sub-committee on International Human Rights. During her tenure as chair, the subcommittee undertook a major study of the human rights situation of the Uyghurs which ultimately led to a resolution in the Canadian Parliament declaring that the treatment of the Uyghur people in China constitutes a genocide, The subcommittee issued a second report in 2020 for which it was formally sanctioned by China. Other major studies completed while Vandenbeld chaired the subcommittee include the 'Global State of the Free Press' and 'Women Human Rights Defenders'. The report on women human rights defenders recommended a special immigration stream for human rights and democracy advocates under persecution around the world. This resulted in the Government establishing a new refugee stream for up to 250 human rights defenders and their families annually, with a special focus on journalists, women and LGBTI activists. As chair, Vandenbeld also initiated an annual recognition of women human rights champions.

Ethics Inquiry 
Vandenbeld was investigated in 2018 by the Ethics Commissioner for possible violation of the Conflict of Interest Code for Members of the House of Commons during the 2018 Ottawa municipal election campaign by endorsing her husband.

On July 10, 2019, the Ethics Commissioner released his final report  and recommended that "no sanction be imposed because it was apparent to me that Ms. Vandenbeld’s failure to comply with section 11 of the Code occurred through an error in judgment made in good faith. She had made significant efforts to comply with the rules that she had considered, namely the Members By-law of the House of Commons’ Board of Internal Economy. She expressed a sincere belief that running for public office did not engage private interests. She also immediately stopped all of her campaign activities upon seeking and obtaining my advice in October 2018."

Second term as MP
On July 29, 2018  Anita Vandenbeld was nominated as the candidate for re-election in the 2019 Canadian federal election by the Liberal Party of Canada. She was elected with 45.6% of the votes. In her second term, Vandenbeld sat on the House of Commons sub-committee on International Human Rights and the Standing Committee on National Defence.

On December 12, 2019 Vandenbeld was appointed by the Prime Minister as the Parliamentary Secretary to the Minister of National Defence.

Vandenbeld is the nominated candidate for the Federal Liberal party for Ottawa West-Nepean for the next federal election.

Third term as MP 
On December 3, 2021, Vandenbeld was appointed by the Prime Minister as Parliamentary secretary to the Minister of International Development.

Electoral record

References

External links

1971 births
Living people
Canadian civil servants
Women members of the House of Commons of Canada
Liberal Party of Canada MPs
Members of the House of Commons of Canada from Ontario
Politicians from Calgary
Politicians from Ottawa
Canadian officials of the United Nations
University of Calgary alumni
Women in Ontario politics
York University alumni
21st-century Canadian politicians
21st-century Canadian women politicians